Saint-Ouen-Marchefroy is a commune in the Eure-et-Loir department in northern France.

Population

Sights
Five Crosses: monument to five brothers killed in combat in the 11th century at the intersection of route D933 (Route de Houdan) and D136 north toward Marchefroy. This monument is depicted on the coat of arms of the commune. Another notable "Five Crosses" monument exists at Ploubezre.

See also
Communes of the Eure-et-Loir department

References

Communes of Eure-et-Loir